Ruffing Montessori School, the second oldest Montessori school established in the United States, was begun in 1959 through the efforts of the Cleveland Montessori Association. The organization founded and operated Montessori preschool and elementary classes in rented locations throughout Cleveland. 
 
In 1964, a donation of a classroom building and property on Fairmount Boulevard in Cleveland Heights enabled the east side school to have a permanent location. In 1977, the east and west side schools separated, each retaining the name Ruffing in honor of Mary and Jim Ruffing, who led the Cleveland Montessori Association in its efforts to introduce Montessori to Northeast Ohio. With a current enrollment of 326, Ruffing in Cleveland Heights operates from a large, new facility, built according to LEED principles.

References

External links
 http://www.ruffingmontessori.net/
WKYC article about the school's environmental policies
Ohio Association of Independent Schools
Cleveland Council of Independent Schools
Independent Schools Association of the Central States
Ruffing Montessori School Photovoltaic Plant
Heights Observer Article: Ruffing Montessori Demonstrates Curriculum in a Green School

Cleveland Heights, Ohio
Educational institutions established in 1959
Montessori schools in the United States
Private middle schools in Ohio
Private elementary schools in Ohio
1959 establishments in Ohio